Zhou Xiaolan (simplified Chinese: 周晓兰, born October 9, 1957) is a former Chinese volleyball player who was a starting middle blocker for the China Women's National Volleyball Team, which won three gold medals in three world competitions in the early nineteen eighties.

Career
In 1984, she was a core member of the Chinese volleyball team which won the Gold Medal at the Los Angeles Summer Olympics over Team USA.

Zhou was born in Nanjing, Jiangsu Province. In 1973, she entered an amateur sports school to play volleyball, and was enrolled in Shanxi provincial team in the same year. In 1977, Zhou was admitted to the Chinese Junior National Team, and later, to the Chinese National Team.

After retiring in 1984, Zhou studied at Shanghai Sports College and later served in China National Sports Commission and was the vice chief of "balls" section. In 1995, she resigned from the position and went to the United States with her husband. She first served as a volleyball coach at George Washington University. Later she gave up sports career and became an engineer in a medical device company in Maryland. However, she still teaches volleyball and holds classes of several levels each week at a center, CCACC, with about 20-50 students in each class.

In 2014, she started her own girls volleyball club, the East Coast Elite, which is located in Howard County, Maryland, where she is currently coaches.

She has 2 daughters, Lucy and Mary, who both attended University of Maryland, College Park.

Awards

National team
 1981 World Cup -  Gold Medal
 1982 World Championship -  Gold Medal
 1984 Los Angeles Olympic Games -  Gold Medal

References

External links
 profile

1957 births
Living people
Chinese women's volleyball players
Volleyball players at the 1984 Summer Olympics
Olympic volleyball players of China
Olympic gold medalists for China
Olympic medalists in volleyball
Sportspeople from Nanjing
Asian Games medalists in volleyball
Volleyball players at the 1978 Asian Games
Volleyball players at the 1982 Asian Games
Medalists at the 1984 Summer Olympics
Volleyball players from Jiangsu
Medalists at the 1978 Asian Games
Medalists at the 1982 Asian Games
Asian Games gold medalists for China
Asian Games silver medalists for China
20th-century Chinese women